MACBA may refer to:

Museum of Contemporary Art of Buenos Aires, Argentina
Barcelona Museum of Contemporary Art, Spain